The 2016–17 season is Huddersfield Town's fifth consecutive season in the Championship and 108th year in existence. Along with competing in the Championship, the club participated in the FA Cup and League Cup.

Huddersfield Town were promoted to the Premier League on 29 May 2017, following a 4–3 penalty shootout victory over Reading in the 2017 EFL Championship play-off final, after drawing 0–0 in both normal and extra time.

The season covers the period from 1 July 2016 to 30 June 2017.

Transfers

Transfers in

Loans in

Loans out

Transfers out

Kit
The 2016–17 season was the club's fourth with technical kit supplier Puma. Pure Legal Limited, Radian B & Covonia continued their individual sponsorships of the home, away and third shirts, respectively.

For the second season in a row, the home kit featured white shorts and socks, with a return to a deeper shade of blue in the stripes along with a wide collar. The away kit kept the popular fluorescent yellow theme from the previous season, but this time the shirt included black hoops, and was paired with black shorts and socks (except for the away game at Wolves, in which it was worn with fluorescent yellow shorts and socks). The third kit was created to honour former Town full-back Ray Wilson, and its release coincided with the 50th anniversary of the 1966 World Cup Final in which Wilson played.

|
|
|
|
|
|
|
|

Squad statistics

Appearances and goals
20:23, 18 January 2017 (UTC)

|}

Cards

Competitions

Pre-season friendlies

Overview

Championship

Results summary

Results by round

League table

Matches
On 22 June 2016, the fixtures for the forthcoming season were announced.

Play-offs

FA Cup

EFL Cup
On 22 June 2016, the first round draw was made, Huddersfield Town were drawn away against Shrewsbury Town.

References

Huddersfield Town
Huddersfield Town A.F.C. seasons